M. S. Narayana (16 April 1951–23 January 2015) was an Indian actor who appeared in Telugu films.

As actor

As director 
 Koduku (2004)
 Bhajantrilu (2007)

References 

Indian filmographies
Male actor filmographies